Chakhansur is a town in southwestern Afghanistan near Iranian border. It is the center of Chakhansur District of Nimruz Province.

Chakhansur is a principal town of the large Khashrud delta oasis in northeastern Sistan.

See also 
 Chakhansur District

Sources 
Encyclopædia Iranica: ČAḴĀNSŪR, accessed: March 2012.

Populated places in Nimruz Province